Thomas Pitt Cholmondeley-Tapper (31 July 1910, in Wellington – 27 July 2001, in Headington, Oxfordshire) was an auto racing driver from New Zealand, the first great New Zealander auto driver before Graham McRae, Chris Amon, Bruce McLaren, Denny Hulme and others. He was known as "George", and he came from Norwegian ancestry. An expert skier and amateur driver racing Bugattis, an old GP Maserati 8CM he had bought from Earl Howe, and a Ferrari Monza. He was offered a Mercedes-Benz test drive at the end of the 1936 season, and would participate at the 1936 German Grand Prix. He died in England at the age of 90.

Works

References

1910 births
2001 deaths
New Zealand racing drivers
Sportspeople from Wellington City
New Zealand people of Norwegian descent
Grand Prix drivers
European Championship drivers